Ballyclough is an unincorporated community in Dubuque County, in the U.S. state of Iowa.

History
Ballyclough was founded 8 miles from Dubuque. William Kaufman ran the grocery store in Ballyclough. In 1947, the Table Mound Township Hall was located in Ballyclough.

The community's population was 25 in 1890, and was 21 in 1900.

References

Unincorporated communities in Dubuque County, Iowa
Unincorporated communities in Iowa